Asya Plamenova Doycheva, known professionally as Alisia, is a Bulgarian singer. She was born on 1 March 1983 in Ihtiman. She has twin brothers, and she has one child, Valeri Bojinov, with the footballer of the same name. She has been signed with Ara Music since 2002 and has recorded five albums with them. Through the years, she has won multiple awards.

Discography
 Sini noshti (2002)
 Pozhelay me (2004)
 Az sam sexy (2005)
 Nai-vurvezhen (2008)
 Tvoya totalno (2010)

References

External links 
 Alisia at Facebook
 Alisia at Instagram
 Alisia at aramusic.bg

Living people
1983 births
21st-century Bulgarian women singers
Bulgarian folk-pop singers
People from Ihtiman
Association footballers' wives and girlfriends